William Anderson (born 1962) is an American guitarist and song writer.

Anderson studied the guitar with Allen Krantz, Christoph Harlan, and David Starobin, and studied composition with Frank Brickle. His recent recordings include music by Hans Erich Apostel, Milton Babbitt, Paul Hindemith, Ernst Krenek, Meyer Kupferman, and Robert Martin, as well as his own works.

Anderson's compositions include Guitar Variations (1993) for solo guitar, Ear Conception for chamber ensemble (1995), A Giddy Thing for mandolin (2001) and a number of shorter works.

Anderson is co-director of the Cygnus Ensemble (founded 1985), which released its first CD, Broken Consort, in 2001. He teaches the guitar at Sarah Lawrence College. He is also currently the director of the guitar ensemble at Queens College, part of the City University of New York.

References
New York Times review by Allan Kozinn (April 2, 1991), accessed 3 February 2010

External links
Anderson's own website, accessed 3 February 2010

20th-century classical composers
21st-century classical composers
American classical guitarists
American male guitarists
1962 births
Living people
American male classical composers
American classical composers
20th-century American guitarists
21st-century American guitarists
20th-century American composers
20th-century American male musicians
21st-century American male musicians